Enoree is a Census-designated place located in Spartanburg County in the U.S. state of South Carolina. According to the 2010 United States Census, the population was 665.

History
Mountain Shoals Plantation was listed on the National Register of Historic Places in 1979.

Geography
Enoree is located at  (34.660485, -81.96252). These coordinates place the CDP in the southwestern part of the county, near the border with Laurens County.

According to the United States Census Bureau, the CDP has a total land area of 1.548 square miles (3.973 km) and a total water area of 0.036  square mile (0.093  km).

Demographics

References

Census-designated places in Spartanburg County, South Carolina
Census-designated places in South Carolina